The Cogstate Brief Battery (CBB) is a computer-based cognitive assessment used in clinical trials, healthcare, and academic research to measure neurological cognition., developed by Cogstate Ltd.

Assessment 
The 15-minute assessment consists of four cognitive and neuropsychological tests: Detection, Identification, One Card Learning, and One Back. Each test measures functions in areas such as attention, visual learning, and working memory, and is designed specifically for repeated assessment.

Application 
The assessment has been used to measure change in patients with mild cognitive impairment. and dementia, sports-related concussions, fatigue, and alcohol use, and schizophrenia. It can be taken by adults and children, and has minimal practice effects

In 2019, Cogstate and Eisai announced a partnership to make the test available outside the United States, for use in health care and other markets

References 

Psychological tests and scales
Psychological testing
Psychiatric assessment
Cognitive impairment and dementia screening and assessment tools